Small capital I is an additional letter of the Latin alphabet similar in its dimensions to the letter "i" but with a shape based on , its capital form. Although  is usually an allograph of the letter I, it is considered as an additional letter in the African reference alphabet and has been used as such in some publications in Kulango languages in Côte d'Ivoire in the 1990s. In the International Phonetic Alphabet, the lowercase small capital I  is used as the symbol for the near-close near-front unrounded vowel.

Encoding 
Until Unicode 8.0.0 (2015), uppercase I with crossbars was not yet encoded. To fill out the gap, a number of fonts contained a non-standard glyph, or used a code point from Private Use Area of Unicode. But this oddity has gone since the 9.0 version of Unicode (2016).

 Unicode:
 Capital Ɪ:  since Unicode 9.0.0 (2016)
 Lowercase ɪ:  since Unicode 1.0
 ISO 6438:
 Capital Ɪ: missing
 Lowercase ɪ: 0xBF

Glyphs 
In serif (and some other) typefaces the letter  usually has two crossbars, which distinguishes it from the lowercase  (dotless I), otherwise homoglyphical, but whose upper serif has another configuration.

Bibliography 
 Pascal Boyeldieu, Stefan Elders, Gudrun Miehe. 2008. Grammaire koulango (parler de Bouna, Côte d’Ivoire). Köln: Rüdiger Köppe. .
 Diocèse de Bondoukou Nassian. 1992. Syllabaire koulango: réservé aux élèves des cours bibliques en Koulango (Inspiré par les syllabaires de la Société Internationale de Linguistique, collection: « Je lis ma langue », Nouvelles Éditions Africaines / EDICEF). Nassian: Diocèse de Bondoukou.
 Ahoua, F., & Adouakou, S. (2009). Parlons agni indénié. Côte d’Ivoire. Paris: L’Harmattan.
 UNESCO. 1980. Alphabet africain de référence. Paris: UNESCO, Secteur de la Culture et de la Communication.

Phonetic transcription symbols
Latin-script letters
Vowel letters